Rastede is a railway station located in Rastede, Germany. The station is located on the Oldenburg–Wilhelmshaven railway. The train services are operated by NordWestBahn.

Train services
The station is served by the following services:

Regional services  Wilhelmshaven - Varel - Oldenburg - Cloppenburg - Bramsche - Osnabrück

References

Railway stations in Lower Saxony